Couric is a surname. Notable people with the surname include:

Emily Couric (1947–2001), American politician
Katie Couric (born 1957), American journalist, presenter, producer, and author